Morden im Norden is a German police procedural that has been broadcast by Das Erste since February 2012.  The show is set in Lübeck, Germany. The city is a World Heritage Site. The gothic Holstentor is frequently visible.

The series is part of a group of several with similar themes entitled "Heiter bis tödlich."

Episodes

Season 1

Season 2

Season 3

See also
List of German television series

External links

References

German crime television series
2010s German police procedural television series
2020s German police procedural television series
2014 German television series debuts
German-language television shows
Das Erste original programming